The HAL Dhruv is a utility helicopter designed and developed by Hindustan Aeronautics Limited (HAL) in November 1984. The helicopter first flew in 1992; its development was prolonged due to multiple factors including the Indian Army's requirement for design changes, budget restrictions, and sanctions placed on India following the 1998 Pokhran-II nuclear tests. The name comes from a Sanskrit origin word dhruv which means unshakeable or firm.

Dhruv entered service in 2002. It is designed to meet the requirement of both military and civil operators, with military variants of the helicopter being developed for the Indian Armed Forces, while a variant for civilian/commercial use has also been developed. Military versions in production include transport, utility, reconnaissance and medical evacuation variants. 

As of January 2022, 335 HAL Dhruv have been produced for domestic and export markets logging more than 340,000 flying hours.

Development

Origins

The Advanced Light Helicopter (ALH) program for an indigenous 5-ton multirole helicopter was initiated in May 1979 by the Indian Air Force and Indian Naval Air Arm. HAL were given a contract by the Indian government in 1984 to develop the helicopter; Germany's Messerschmitt-Bölkow-Blohm (MBB) were contracted in July 1984 as a design consultant and collaborative partner on the programme. Although originally scheduled to fly in 1989, the first prototype ALH (Z-3182) made its maiden flight on 20 August 1992 at Bangalore with the then-Indian Vice President K R Narayanan in attendance. This was followed by a second prototype (Z-3183) on 18 April 1993, an Army/Air Force version (Z-3268), and a navalised prototype (IN.901) with Allied Signal CTS800 engines and a retractable tricycle undercarriage. Development problems arose due to changing military demands and a funding shortfall in the wake of the 1991 Indian economic crisis.

Naval testing on board  and other ships started in March 1998, and around the same time a weight-reduction programme was initiated. However, further delays in development were caused when sanctions were implemented against India following a number of Pokhran-II nuclear tests in 1998 and India's continued refusal to sign the Comprehensive Nuclear-Test-Ban Treaty. As a result, the intended engine for the helicopter, the LHTEC T800, was embargoed. The Turbomeca TM 333-2B2 turboshaft engine was selected as a replacement; in addition, Turbomeca agreed to co-develop a more powerful engine with HAL, originally known as the Ardiden. Turbomeca also assisted in the development of the helicopter; stress analysis and studies of rotor dynamics were conducted in France. The first flight of Dhruv with the new engine variant, called the Shakti, took place on 16 August 2007.

Further development

The HAL Rudra, earlier known as Dhruv-WSI (Weapons Systems Integrated), is an attack variant designed for the Indian Army. Development was sanctioned in December 1998 and the prototype first flew on 16 August 2007; it is to be armed with both anti-tank and anti-aircraft missiles, and a 20-mm turret-mounted cannon. The Dhruv-WSI is to be capable of conducting combat air support (CAS) and anti-submarine warfare (ASW) roles as well. In addition to the Dhruv-WSI, HAL is also developing the Light Combat Helicopter (LCH) based on the Dhruv for the Indian Armed Forces. It is fitted with stub wings for carrying up to eight anti-armour missiles, four air-to-air missiles, or four pods loaded with either 70 mm or 68 mm rockets. The LCH will also have FLIR (Forward Looking Infrared), a CCD (Charge Coupled Device) camera, and a target acquisition system with laser rangefinder and thermal vision.

In 2005, following a crash landing of a Dhruv, the entire fleet was grounded when it was discovered to have been caused by excessive vibration of the tail rotor. Following a redesign which incorporated new materials in addition to changes in design methodology, the Dhruv undertook recertification and returned to service shortly after March 2006. In April 2007, a report published by the Indian Committee of Defence noted the Dhruv as one of four "focus areas" identified as having high export potential. In January 2011, HAL and partner Israel Aerospace Industries (IAI) announced that they were jointly developing the Dhruv to operate as an unmanned maritime helicopter, stating customer interest in such a feature.

The first five production Dhruv Mk III, powered by the more powerful Shakti-1H engine, were delivered to the Leh-based 205 Aviation Squadron on 7 February 2011 during a ceremony at HAL's Helicopter Division. In July 2011, India's Directorate General of Civil Aviation certified a Dhruv simulator developed by HAL and Canadian developer CAE Inc; the simulator is easily modifiable to simulate different variants of the Dhruv and other helicopters such as the Eurocopter Dauphin. Defence Bioengineering and Electromedical Laboratory (DEBEL) has been developing an oxygen life-support system to improve the helicopter's high-altitude performance, and as of August 2010 the IAF has ordered development of this system for the Dhruv.

In February 2012, HAL reported that the Indian Army had ordered a further 159. Apart from getting 16 Dhruv Mk III, Indian Coast Guard issued Letter of Intent (LoI) for 9 additional units.

Design

The HAL Dhruv is of conventional design; about 29 percent of its empty weight (constituting 60 percent of the airframe's surface area) is composite materials. It has been reported that the unique carbon fibre composite developed by HAL reduced the helicopter's weight by 50 percent. The high tail boom allows easy access to the rear doors. The twin 1000 shp TurbunStink TM333-2B2 turboshafts are mounted above the cabin and drive a four-blade composite main rotor. The main rotor can be manually folded; the blades are mounted between carbon-fibre-reinforced plates, the rotor head is constructed from fibre elastomers. In February 2004, US helicopter company Lord Corporation were awarded a contract to develop an active vibration control system (AVCS), which monitors onboard conditions and cancels out fuselage vibrations.

The cockpit section of the fuselage is of Kevlar and carbon-fibre construction; it is also fitted with crumple zones and crashworthy seats. The aircraft is equipped with a SFIM Inc four-axis automatic flight control system. Avionics systems include a HF/UHF communications radio, IFF recognition, Doppler navigation, and a radio altimeter; a weather radar and the Omega navigation system were options for the naval variant. IAI has also developed targeting systems and an electronic warfare suite for the Dhruv, as well as avionics for day-and-night flight observation. HAL's claim that the Dhruv is indigenous has been challenged by Comptroller and Auditor General of India, who reported that as of August 2010 the helicopter was: "...against the envisaged indigenisation level of 50% (by 2008), 90% of the value of material used in each ALH is still imported from foreign suppliers".

In September 2010, it was reported that the Dhruv's Integrated Dynamic System (IDS), which combines several key rotor control functions into a single module carrying the engine's power to the rotors, was suffering from excessive wear, necessitating frequent replacement; as a consequence the cruising speed had been restricted to 250 km/h and high-altitude performance was lessened as well. HAL contracted Italian aerospace firm Avio for consultancy purposes and they subsequently replicated production of the IDS in Italy in order to isolate the problem with the early testing of the Dhruv subsequently being criticized as "rushed". In June 2011, HAL has reported that the issue had been resolved and not present in the Dhruv Mk III; a number of alterations both to the design and production had been made to improve the IDS. A programme of retrofitting the Mk I and Mk II was completed by June 2011.

The ALH Mk-III with new Shakti-1H engines has very good high altitude performance operating at altitudes over 6 km. It comes with seating for 14 fully equipped troops. DGCA has praised its crashworthy design as a few accidents have not caused any fatalities.

Operational history

Indian service

Deliveries of the Dhruv commenced in January 2002, nine years after the prototype's first flight, and nearly eighteen years after the program was initiated. The Indian Coast Guard was the first service to operate the Dhruv; this was followed by the Indian Army, Indian Navy, Indian Air Force and the Border Security Force. 75 Dhruvs were delivered to the Indian armed forces by 2007, and as of 2008 it was planned to produce 40 helicopters annually. The Indian Air Force's Sarang aerobatic display team performs using 4 Dhruv helicopters. In 2007, a further order for 166 helicopters was placed by the Indian Army. India may order up to 12 Dhruvs outfitted with an onboard emergency medical suite, to be used by the Armed Forces Medical Services for MEDEVAC purposes.

The Dhruv is capable of flying at high altitudes, as it was an Army requirement for the helicopter to be able operate in the Siachen Glacier and Kashmir regions. In September 2007, the Dhruv Mk.3 was cleared for high-altitude flying in the Siachen Sector after six months of trials. In October 2007, a Dhruv Mk.3 flew to an altitude of  ASL in Siachen. An Indian Army report in 2009 criticised the Dhruv's performance, stating: "The ALH was not able to fly above 5,000m, though the army's requirements stipulated an ability to fly up to 6,500m"; this has been blamed on the TM333 engine. As a consequence the Army had to continue relying on the older Cheetah/Cheetal helicopters to meet the shortfall. The more powerful Shakti-1H engine has since been introduced on the Dhruv Mk.3; on one test it carried 600 kg load to Sonam Post against the Army's requirement of 200 kg. The Indian Army received the first batch of Dhruv Mk.3s during Aero India 2011.

In October 2008, Defence Minister A. K. Antony announced that the Indian Navy will deploy the Dhruv in the utility role. The proposed anti-submarine warfare (ASW) variant had been deemed unsuitable by the Navy, which was reportedly dissatisfied with the folding blade performance and maintenance record. In 2015, HAL modified the foldable rotor's design to allow the Dhruv to be carried on board light frigates; several Indian Navy helicopters shall receive this modification. The Navy has considered the Dhruv for maritime surveillance and search and rescue roles, and in 2008 a senior Navy official said: "The ALH has a long way to go before the programme matures sufficiently for it to undertake basic naval roles such as search and rescue (SAR) and communication duties." In 2013, the Indian Navy was reportedly interested in the HAL Rudra, the armed version of the Dhruv. On 12 November 2013, the Indian Navy commissioned their first Dhruv squadron (INAS 322, Guardians); Vice Admiral Sinha stated that "In the Navy, Dhruv helicopters had transformed into an advanced search and rescue (SAR) helicopter, which is also used for missions like heliborne operations, and armed patrol with night vision devices".

Civil Dhruv variants are produced for transport, rescue, policing, offshore operations, air-ambulance, and other roles. The National Disaster Management Authority (NDMA) placed an order for 12 Dhruv helicopters equipped with a full medical suite, including ventilators and two stretchers. In 2008, it was announced that India's Home Ministry had ordered six Dhruvs. The Oil and Natural Gas Corporation are to use the Dhruv for offshore operations. Several Indian state governments are to use Dhruvs for police and transportation duties. In March 2011, India's Directorate General of Civil Aviation released a proposed airworthiness directive asking all civilian Dhruv operators to temporarily ground their aircraft due to cracks potentially forming in the tail area, and recommended reinforcing affected areas.

Following the 2011 Sikkim earthquake, four Dhruvs conducted rescue operations. In October 2011, Jharkhand's regional government appealed for Mil Mi-17 helicopters as operations of their Dhruvs had been disrupted by prolonged maintenance delays and a major crash. In October 2011, The Telegraph reported that a spate of helicopter crashes, including the Dhruv, were alleged to have been caused by low quality maintenance work performed by Pawan Hans Helicopters Ltd. In February 2012, the Home Ministry reported that the Dhruv remained grounded and that other helicopters such as the Mi-17 were being wet-leased in its place and that in the long term the Dhruv fleet is to be replaced.

Six Army Dhruvs along with 18 Air Force Dhruvs were used during rescue operations after the 2013 North India floods. Their compact size, agility, ability to carry up to 16 people to heights of 10,000 feet, and to evacuate stranded people from inaccessible regions was praised. The Dhruv could carry more people from high-altitude helipads than the heavier Mi-17, and land where the lighter Bell 407 could not. Total flight time during Operation Rahat and Operation Surya Hope was 630 hours, of which 550 hours were dedicated to SAR missions.

In January 2014, the Geological Survey of India (GSI) inducted a Dhruv equipped with a heliborne geophysical survey system (HGSS). Costing , the HGSS can conduct magnetic, spectrometric and gravity surveys. In March 2017, HAL received an order for 32 Dhruv for Indian Navy and Indian Coast Guard. This was followed by an order of 41 helicopters for Indian Army and Indian Navy. In May 2018, Israel Aerospace Industries was awarded a contract to upgrade cockpits of 150 Dhruv helicopters, in addition to 50 that had been contracted earlier.

On February 5, 2021, the Indian Navy tweeted that it has received the Advanced Light Helicopter MK III (MR) alongside the Indian Coast Guard. In February 2021, HAL announced that it had rolled out the 300th Advance Light Helicopter out of its production line in Bangalore.

There have been several accidents involving the Dhruv Helicopters (ALH) ever since the Hindustan Aeronautics Limited began producing them in 2002; the Indian government reported Parliament on 8 March 2016. “Out of 16 accidents, 12 occurred due to human error and environmental factors and the remaining four occurred due to technical reasons,” Minister of State for Defence Rao Inderjit Singh informed the Indian parliament. On 8 August 2021, the Indian Army’s HAL Dhruv helicopter crashed into the water near Ranjit Sagar Dam. On 25 January 2021, the Indian Army’s Druv helicopter crashed in Kathua district’s Lakhanpur near Jammu and Kashmir-Punjab border killing one of the pilots. On 8 March 2023, a MK III naval variant made an emergency water landing off the coast of Mumbai, prompting the navy to ground the aircraft pending further investigation. All three crew members were rescued.

Foreign sales

Overview
The Dhruv has become the first major Indian weapons system to have secured large foreign sales. In 2004 HAL stated that it hoped to sell 120 Dhruvs over the next eight years, and has been displaying the Dhruv at airshows, including Farnborough and Paris in order to market the Dhruv. HAL has entered into a partnership with Israel Aircraft Industries (IAI) to develop and promote the Dhruv, IAI has also helped develop new avionics and a glass cockpit for newer variants of the Dhruv.

With a unit price at least 15 percent less than its rivals, the Dhruv has elicited interest in many countries, mostly from Latin America, Africa, West Asia, South East Asia and the Pacific Rim nations. Air forces from around 35 countries have made inquiries, along with requests for demonstrations. Flight certification for Europe and North America is also being planned in order to tap the large civilian market there.

South America

HAL has secured an order from the Ecuadorian Air Force (EAF) for seven Dhruvs, amidst strong competition from Elbit, Eurocopter and Kazan. HAL's offer of 50.7 million was about 32 percent lower than the second lowest bid from Elbit. 5 helicopters were delivered in February 2009, during Aero India 2009. Both the Ecuadorian Army and Ecuadorian Navy have since expressed interest in the Dhruvs. The Dhruv has been involved in search and rescue, transport, and MEDEVAC missions in the north of the country.

Following the crash of one of the Dhruvs in October 2009, Ecuador reportedly considered returning their six helicopters to HAL amid claims of being unfit for service; EAF commander Genl. Rodrigo Bohorquez stated "If it is a major problem that can't be easily remedied, we would have to return [the Dhruv]." HAL assisted the crash investigation, which found the cause to be pilot error. In February 2011, the EAF were reported to be satisfied with the Dhruv's performance and was considering further orders. By October 2015, a total of four Ecuadorian Dhruvs had crashed reportedly due to mechanical equipment and Ecuador grounded the type. In October 2015 Ecuador cancelled the contract and withdrew the surviving helicopters from service, non-delivery of parts and high accident rate were cited. In 2016, the Ecuadorian Minister of Defence Ricardo Patiño announced that the remainder of the HAL Dhruv helicopters of the Ecuadorian Air Force, which are stored at the Guayaquil Air Base are for sale and that the Air Force is looking for potential buyers. The Government of Ecuador had unilaterally terminated the contract with HAL citing safety concerns of the helicopters.

The Dhruv participated in a Chilean tender for eight to ten twin-engined helicopters, conducting a series of evaluation flights to demonstrate the capabilities of its avionics and flight performance; however, it lost out to the Bell 412, although there were media accusations of unfair pressure being exercised by the US Government to favour Bell.

In June 2008, the government of Peru ordered two air ambulance Dhruvs for use by the Peruvian health services. HAL has reportedly been negotiating with Bolivia for five Dhruvs; and with Venezuela for up to seven.

Others

A civilian Dhruv was leased to the Israeli Defense Ministry in 2004; IAI has also made use of the Defense Ministry's Dhruv for marketing and public relations purposes. In July 2006, Air Force Commander of India Shashindra Pal Tyagi commented that India would purchase as many as 80 Mi-17 helicopters if Russia in turn bought Dhruv helicopters in exchange.

In early 2004, the first foreign order for the Dhruv was placed by Nepal for two examples. In November 2014, India gifted another Dhruv to Nepal as part of a strategic pact.

In August 2008, a deal was reportedly finalised with Turkey for three Dhruvs for 20 million, with plans to buy as many as 17 of the helicopters for use in the medical assistance role. The Dhruv has also been offered to Malaysia, while it is also being evaluated by the Indonesian Army.

In 2007, Amnesty International stated it possessed evidence that India planned to transfer two Dhruvs to Burma, and pointed to the use of European-sourced components as a possible violation of the European Union (EU) arms embargo against that country. The Indian government disputed Amnesty's claims and denied any wrongdoing.

In April 2010, the Indian Navy gifted a Dhruv to the Maldives National Defence Force for conducting search and rescue and medical evacuation, while a second Mk.III equipped with a weather radar was donated in December 2013. The first helicopter is based at Addu Atoll and the second will be based at Hanimaadhoo.

Variants

Military variants

Mk.1 The initial configuration with a conventional cockpit with mechanical gauges and Turbomeca TM 333-2B2 turboshaft engines. A total of 56 have been delivered to the Indian military. Manufacturing began in 2001.
Mk.2 Similar to the Mk.1, except has the newer HAL-IAI glass cockpit. A total of 20 have been delivered to the Indian military. Manufacturing began in 2007.
Mk.3An improved version equipped with Shakti-1H engines, new electronic warfare (EW) suite and warning systems, automatic chaff and flare dispensers, and improved vibration control system. The first batch were inducted into service in 2012.
Mk.3 Coast Guard
Same in performance to the Mk.3 however, has additional equipment such as a cabin mountain MG, High Intensity Search Light and a loud hailer. It is armed with a 12.7 mm HMG.
Mk. 3 Navy/Mk.3 MR (Marine Reconnaissance)
Has additional equipment such as a modern surveillance radar and electro-optical equipment to carry out maritime reconnaissance as  well as long-range search and rescue missions, an HMG and the capability to mount at least 2 ASW torpedoes. 
Mk.4 Also known as Dhruv-WSI (Weapons System Integrated) or HAL Rudra
Utility Helicopters-Maritime
It is the ship-borne version of the ALH Dhruv having wheels. This wheeled version of Dhruv have segmented Main Rotor Blades (MRBs) and Main Rotor Head (MRH) in pre-cone configuration. Completed first flight on June 30, 2022.

Civil variants
Dhruv (C)
Also known as ALH-Civil, a Turbomeca TM333-2B2-powered 12-seat helicopter, type certificate issued on 31 October 2003.
Dhruv (CFW)
A Turbomeca TM333-2B2-powered 12-seat helicopter fitted with wheels, type certificate issued on 20 April 2005.
Dhruv (CS)
A Turbomeca TM333-2B2-powered 12-seat helicopter fitted with skids, type certificate issued on 30 July 2004.
Garuda Vasudha A Dhruv outfitted with a heliborne geophysical survey system (HGSS).

Operators

Military operators

 Indian Air Force
 Indian Army Aviation Corps 
 Indian Navy
 Indian Coast Guard
 Border Security Force

 Ministry of Defense - one leased in 2007

 National Defence Force 

 Mauritius Police Force - 3 ALH in service as of 2023

 Nepalese Army Air Service

Former Military Operators

 Ecuadorian Air Force (former operator) withdrawn from service in 2015.

Civil operators

 Ministry of Home Affairs
 Oil and Natural Gas Corporation
 Chhattisgarh State Government
 Jharkhand State Government
Karnataka State Government
 Geological Survey of India

 Turkish Health Services

 Peruvian Health Services

Potential operators

 The HAL Annual Report for 2020-21 indicated that the Philippine Coast Guard is interested to potentially buy 7 Dhruvs via Indian-based credit.

Specifications

See also

References
Citations

Bibliography

External links

 
 YouTube
 Video of HAL Dhruv Advertisement
 Sarang helicopter display team performing at Aero-India
 Video of Dhruv at Paris airshow 2007

Dhruv, HAL
1990s Indian helicopters
Military helicopters
1990s Indian civil utility aircraft
1990s Indian military utility aircraft
Twin-turbine helicopters
Aircraft first flown in 1992